Oullins is a commune in the Metropolis of Lyon in Auvergne-Rhône-Alpes region in eastern France.

It is a suburb of the city of Lyon, and is adjacent to it on the southwest.

Population

Transport
Several Buses (C7, C10, 8, 12, 14, 17, 63, 88) 
Subway Line B in December 2013.
Oullins station, which is part of the TER Auvergne-Rhône-Alpes rail network

Notable people
Jean-Bryan Boukaka, footballer
François Boulliat, fencer
Barbara Buatois, cyclist
Paul Jules Deschanel, father of director Caleb and grandfather of actresses Zooey and Emily
Patrice Garande, footballer
Sabrina Palie, basketball athlete
Pierre Saby, rugby player
Joseph Marie Jacquard
Louis Charles Émile Lortet, physician, botanist, zoologist and Egyptologist. 
Lionel Bah, professional football player 
Féthi Harek, professional football player
Patrick de Gayardon, skydiver
Charles Le Gendre, American Civil War general & first foreign advisor in Japan
Dora Jemaa-Amirouche, Athlete(400m hurdles)
Clément Turpin, football referee
Olivier Panis, racing driver

Twin towns
 Nürtingen, Germany, since 1962
 Pescia, Italy, since 1994

See also
Communes of the Metropolis of Lyon

References

External links

 Official website (in French)

Communes of Lyon Metropolis
Lyonnais